Igor Vasilyevich Gamula (17 February 1960 – 8 December 2021) was a Ukrainian and Russian professional football coach and player. He was also a scout for FC Rostov. He made his debut in the Soviet Top League in 1978 for FC Zorya Voroshylovhrad. Gamula had Ukrainian and Russian citizenship.

Managerial career
Gamula was appointed manager of FC Rostov on 25 September 2014 following the resignation of Miodrag Božović.

Following FC Rostov's 1–0 win over FC Ural, Gamula became involved in a racism row following question to the possibility of Rostov signing Benoit Angbwa, saying that six "dark-skinned players" was sufficient for the team. On 12 November Gamula was handed a five-game ban following his remarks.

On 18 December, Gamula was appointed Rostov's youth team manager, with Kurban Berdyev replacing him as manager of the first team.

Gamula died on 8 December 2021, at the age of 61.

Honours
 Soviet Cup 1981 (FC SKA Rostov-on-Don)

References

External links
 Fired from the Latvian club 
 

1960 births
2021 deaths
Soviet footballers
Ukrainian footballers
Russian footballers
Association football midfielders
FC Zorya Luhansk players
FC SKA Rostov-on-Don players
FC Rostov players
FC Krystal Kherson players
Ukrainian First League players
Soviet Top League players
Soviet Second League players
Ukrainian football managers
Russian football managers
Ukrainian Premier League managers
Ukrainian First League managers
FC Krystal Kherson managers
FC Tavriya Novotroitske managers
FC Hoverla Uzhhorod managers
People from Alchevsk
FC Chernomorets Novorossiysk managers
Russian Premier League managers
FC Rostov managers
Dinaburg FC managers
FC SKA Rostov-on-Don managers
Expatriate football managers in Latvia
Sportspeople from Luhansk Oblast